ADPF 187 (June 15, 2011), is a landmark Brazil Supreme Court case. The rapporteur Celso de Mello voted in favor of protests of decriminalization of drugs.

Right
After of the decision of the Supreme Court, the people will not be penalized:
People can to protest in favor of decriminalization of drugs.

High Court decision

Judiciary representation

Legislative representation

Executive representation

Amici curiae

See also

 Drug liberalization
 Global Marijuana March
 Cannabis

References

Cannabis in Brazil
Brazilian legislation